Sleeping Partners is a 1930 British comedy film directed by Seymour Hicks and starring Hicks, Edna Best and Lyn Harding. It is based on the 1916 play Let's Make a Dream by Sacha Guitry. It was shot at Islington Studios.

Cast
 Seymour Hicks as He 
 Edna Best as She 
 Lyn Harding as It 
 Herbert Waring as Emile 
 Marguerite Allan as Elise 
 David Paget as Virtuoso

References

Bibliography
 Low, Rachael. Filmmaking in 1930s Britain. George Allen & Unwin, 1985.
 Wood, Linda. British Films, 1927-1939. British Film Institute, 1986.

External links

1930 films
British comedy films
1930 comedy films
Films directed by Seymour Hicks
British black-and-white films
British films based on plays
Films based on works by Sacha Guitry
Paramount Pictures films
Islington Studios films
1930s English-language films
1930s British films